Brenda Smith may refer to:
 Brenda V. Smith, law professor
 Brenda Smith (model)